Bundesdruckerei ("Federal Press", short form: BDr) produces documents and devices for secure identification and offers corresponding services. It is based in the Berlin district of Kreuzberg. In addition to complete passport and ID card systems, the security printing house also offers ID documents, high-security cards, document checking devices, security software and trust center services. Bundesdruckerei also produces banknotes, stamps, visas, vehicle documents, tobacco revenue stamps and electronic publications. It was founded as Reichsdruckerei ("Reich press") in 1879 and existed under this name until 1945. The Ottoman Halid Hamid reported in 1918 that the print was of remarkable quality and they were even able to print Egyptian hieroglyphs in prints for Museums in Egypt. Further they printed in a variety of scripts such as Cyrillic, Georgian, Armenian, Arabic, Kurdish or Syriac among others.

In 1951, it became Bundesdruckerei. It expanded into multiple security-related fields after being privatised in 1994. In 2009 it became a state-owned enterprise again.

In September 2014, Bundesdruckerei succeeded, in a case referred to the European Court of Justice, in obtaining a preliminary ruling that the City of Dortmund could not require tenderers for a document digitalisation contract to commit to paying German minimum wage levels to the workforce when they were intending to sub-contract the performance of the contract to a firm based in Poland outside the scope of the German minimum wage law.

In 2015, Bundesdruckerei won the tender to provide the International Civil Aviation Organization Public Key Directory (ICAO PKD).

See also
 Österreichische Staatsdruckerei (de) - the corresponding agency in Austria

References

External links
Official website

Printing companies of Germany
Publishing companies established in 1879
Banknote printing companies
Manufacturing companies based in Berlin
Government-owned companies of Germany